The Dominican Summer League Diamondbacks or DSL Diamondbacks, commonly called the DSL D-backs, are a Rookie League affiliate of the Arizona Diamondbacks based in the Dominican Republic. They play in the Baseball City Division of the Dominican Summer League.

History
The team first came into existence in 1996, two years before the MLB debut of the Arizona Diamondbacks.  They have been an independent D-backs affiliate throughout their history, although there have been a few seasons where a second squad shared affiliation with other teams.

In 2000, a second squad shared an affiliation with the Boston Red Sox.  In 2003, a second squad shared an affiliation with the Montreal Expos.  A second squad shared an affiliation with the Cincinnati Reds in 2008, and again in 2012.

Rosters

Minor league affiliations

References

Baseball teams established in 1996
Arizona Diamondbacks minor league affiliates
Dominican Summer League teams
Baseball teams in the Dominican Republic